Park Suk-young (born 1973) is a South Korean film director and screenwriter.

Personal life 
Born in 1973, Park studied Korean Literature at Sogang University and Cinema at the Columbia University in New York. He worked as an actor and assistant director in director Jeon Kye-soo's 2010 film Lost & Found before directing his first feature Wild Flowers in 2015. He followed with Steel Flower in 2015 and made his third film Ash Flower in 2016, thus completing his "Flower Trilogy" which deals with the theme of "teenagers in crisis".

Filmography 
Wild Flowers (2015)
Steel Flower (2015)
Ash Flower (2016)

References

External links 
 
 
 

1973 births
Living people
South Korean film directors
South Korean screenwriters
Sogang University alumni